"Late in the Evening" is a song by American singer-songwriter Paul Simon. It was the lead single from his fifth studio album, One-Trick Pony (1980), released on Warner Bros. Records.

His first single release for Warner, "Late in the Evening" was released in July 1980 and became a hit on several charts worldwide. In the U.S., the song hit number six on the Billboard Hot 100. Internationally, the song was a top 20 hit in the Netherlands, Belgium, and New Zealand. The song has received praise for Simon's lyrics, the horn interlude, and the famous drum beat, referred to as a 'groove' by drummer Steve Gadd. Gadd devised the distinctive drum part by using two pairs of drumsticks - one in each hand - in order to give the impression of two drummers playing together, as he has demonstrated in drum clinics. Gadd plays a New York style Cuban Mozambique drum groove.  Billboard described the hook consisting of a "percussive and bass duet" as being "irresistible."  Record World said that it's highlighted by "spirited brass, percussion & guitars." Simon performed the song with Art Garfunkel during their 1981 reunion concert in Central Park in New York City.

Personnel
 Paul Simon – vocals
 Steve Gadd – drums
 Tony Levin – bass
 Eric Gale – electric guitar
 Hugh McCracken – acoustic guitar
 Ralph MacDonald – cowbell, temple blocks
 Dave Grusin – horn arrangements

Chart performance
"Late in the Evening" performed on singles charts in several territories worldwide. In the U.S., the single premiered on the Billboard Hot 100 at position 46 on August 9, 1980, rising over the following weeks to a peak of number six on September 27, 1980. It spent sixteen weeks on the chart in total. It had also peaked at number seven on the magazine's Hot Adult Contemporary Tracks chart two weeks earlier, where it also spent sixteen weeks. In Canada, it first premiered on the magazine's RPM all-genre singles chart, the RPM 100, on August 23 at number 87, eventually peaking at number 19 on October 25. It debuted on the magazine's "Adult Oriented Playlist" chart on September 6, 1980 at number 39, later peaking at number two on October 25.

In the United Kingdom, the song premiered on the UK Singles Chart on August 31, 1980 at number 74, and rose over two weeks to a peak of number 58 on September 14, 1980. It performed better in the Netherlands, peaking at number 11, in Belgium at number 15, and in New Zealand at number 19. Nearby in Australia, the song fared better than its UK performance, peaking at position 34.

Charts

Weekly charts

Year-end charts

Notes

References

Sources

External links
 

1980 songs
1980 singles
Songs written by Paul Simon
Paul Simon songs
Song recordings produced by Paul Simon
Song recordings produced by Phil Ramone
Songs about music
Warner Records singles